Emblyna annulipes is a species of mesh web weaver in the spider family Dictynidae. It is found in North America, Europe, Turkey, Caucasus, and Russia (Far East).

References

Dictynidae
Articles created by Qbugbot
Spiders described in 1846